The retroaortic lymph nodes (or postaortic lymph nodes) are placed below the cisterna chyli, on the bodies of the third and fourth lumbar vertebrae.

They receive lymphatic trunks from the lateral and preaortic glands, while their efferents end in the cisterna chyli.

References

External links
 

Lymphatics of the torso